I Brought You My Bullets, You Brought Me Your Love (often shortened to I Brought You My Bullets or Bullets) is the debut studio album by American rock band My Chemical Romance, released on July 23, 2002 by Eyeball Records. Produced by Thursday vocalist Geoff Rickly, it was recorded at Nada Recording Studio in New Windsor, New York, in May 2002. In the band's 2006 documentary Life on the Murder Scene, the band describes the painful conditions lead singer Gerard Way was in during the recording of the album due to a toothache, causing the album to take longer to record than planned.

Music and lyrical themes
Categorized into genres such as emo, post-hardcore, screamo,  gothic rock, pop punk, and garage punk, I Brought You My Bullets, You Brought Me Your Love has a raw sound featuring guitar riffs, very energetic vocals and occasional screaming. Despite being sold under the  alternative rock genres, it is considered an emo album with strong influences from punk rock, hardcore punk and heavy metal. Songs on I Brought You My Bullets, You Brought Me Your Love such as "Skylines and Turnstiles" and "Our Lady of Sorrows" have been described as hardcore punk songs.

I Brought You My Bullets, You Brought Me Your Love is often regarded as a concept album. It involves two Bonnie and Clyde-esque characters who are eventually gunned down in the desert. On My Chemical Romance's next album, Three Cheers for Sweet Revenge (2004), the unnamed man supposedly then finds himself in purgatory, where he makes a deal with Satan: his hellbound lover for the souls of a thousand evil men. He is then resurrected and sent on his gruesome task. Though it is generally accepted by the group's core fanbase, this has led some to attribute its supposed existence to over-analysis on the part of hardcore fans. The alleged storyline is not confirmed by the band, but some evidence includes:

 The following album's cover, named "Demolition Lovers II" (Two) (As the name is close to the name of the final song on I Brought You My Bullets...) and its interior artwork (including the text that reads "The story of a man, a woman, and the corpses of a thousand evil men.")
 The lyrical themes of the final songs on both of the band's first two albums, which are "Demolition Lovers" and "I Never Told You What I Do for a Living". The lyrics of the latter include "They gave us two shots to the back of the head and we're all dead now" suggesting that the character (if it is linked to the storyline) has been killed and has failed in saving his lover from Hell.
 The song "It's Not a Fashion Statement, It's a Fucking Deathwish" from Three Cheers for Sweet Revenge also includes themes of a man rising from his grave, who suggests that his purpose in doing so is to commit a murder.

Another theme apparent on the album is the nature of vampires, as in both the undead creatures and, metaphorically speaking, those who seek to corrupt and exploit others. The song "Skylines and Turnstiles" was written shortly after the September 11 attacks and expressed feelings of sorrow and loss, and "Early Sunsets over Monroeville" was inspired by the George A. Romero film Dawn of the Dead. Gerard Way describes it as "a sweet song about Dawn of the Dead", with the lyrics using references from the film. Before the September 11 attacks, Way was working as a comic book writer and animator. He was working on a vampire comic (which he never completed), and has also said that is the reason for the vampires in the lyrics.

Release and promotion

Text on the album's disc reads, "Unauthorized duplication is a violation of applicable laws and will result in Gerard coming to your house and sucking your blood." In December 2002, the band went on tour with Misery Signals, Remembering Never and Every Time I Die. In May and June 2003, the band went on tour with Every Time I Die and Give Up the Ghost.

To promote the album, My Chemical Romance played in bars and clubs around New Jersey. Tour manager Brian Schechter noticed the band performing and thought the band would be perfect for opening for the band The Used. Eventually, Schechter became the manager for My Chemical Romance and I Brought You My Bullets, You Brought Me Your Love was noticed by Reprise Records, a major record label connected to Warner Bros. Records. Reprise Records signed My Chemical Romance in 2003.

The 2005 and 2009 re-releases of the album contain a bonus Eyeball Records sampler CD. There are several different versions of the sampler, and each one contains different tracks. Since the closure of Eyeball Records, this album is currently out of print on every format. The album was re-released on vinyl on February 3, 2009, with a clear as well as white and red edition. It has sold over 285,000 copies in the US as of February 2009, also achieving a Gold sales status certification for sales of over 100,000 copies in the UK. Physical copies of the album are very rare in the United States today; however, it returned to iTunes on September 23, 2016 and appeared on Spotify and Google Play the same day. In 2016, Frank Iero stated in an Alternative Press interview that the original pressing of the album is the rarest to date, with only 100 copies being released and sold strictly at the release party in New Jersey.

Track listing

Personnel
My Chemical Romance
 Gerard Way – lead and backing vocals
 Ray Toro – guitars, backing vocals
 Mikey Way – bass guitar
 Matt Pelissier – drums, percussion

Additional musicians
 Frank Iero – additional guitars, backing vocals (tracks 2 and 8)
 Geoff Rickly – backing vocals (track 9)

Production
Produced by Geoff Rickly
Tracks 2 and 8 produced by Geoff Rickly and Alex Saavedra
Recorded and mixed by John Naclerio 5/15/02 – 5/25/02 at Nada Studios, New Windsor, NY
Mastered by Ryan Ball at Checkmate Sound & Recording, Suffern, NY
Original artwork, layout, and design by Marc Debiak and Gerard Way
Photos by Alex Saavedra

Charts

Certifications

Release history

Notes

Citations

Sources

External links

I Brought You My Bullets, You Brought Me Your Love at YouTube (streamed copy where licensed)

2002 debut albums
Screamo albums
Emo albums by American artists
My Chemical Romance albums
Eyeball Records albums
Concept albums